Ampelocissus latifolia is a plant in the Vitoideae subfamily of the grape family native to the Indian subcontinent (Bangladesh, India, Nepal, Pakistan).

It is the type species for the genus of Ampelocissus, and was originally treated under its basionym, Vitis latifolia, which was described scientifically in 1824. The species was moved to Ampelocissus by Jules Émile Planchon in 1884.

References

latifolia
Plants described in 1824
Flora of the Indian subcontinent